Memorial Day (also known as Memorial Day Killer) is a 1999 slasher film directed by Christopher Alender, and written by Marcos Gabriel.

Plot 

The night before Memorial Day, Tyra and Trevor are stabbed to death in their apartment by a cloaked figure in a black and white papier-mâché mask. The next day, Rachel, her cousin Leo, and their five friends (Mickey, Cindy, Seth, Reagan and Jeremy) head to Memorial Lake Campground for the first time since Rachel's adopted brother Danny accidentally drowned there three years ago. After reaching the camp and setting up, the group drink around a campfire and tell ghost stories, though Seth goes back to the cabins to watch television, and catches a news broadcast mentioning the murders of Tyra and Trevor, who were supposed to come along on the trip. Seth rushes back to the others and tells them about what happened to Trevor and Tyra, just as a booby trap launches a spear into Jeremy, killing him, and scattering the group.

Seth tries to drive to safety, but runs out of gas, and is confronted by the killer, who sends a man he had earlier captured out to tell Seth to get out of his car. Seth refuses to get out, so the killer persuades him by shooting the hostage. Back at the camp, Mickey bludgeons a masked man with a baseball bat, unmasking him afterward to discover it was Seth, who was gagged and had his hands tied together. The killer then attacks Reagan, killing her by forcing her to crawl across razor blades while he beats her with a hot piece of rebar. Next, Cindy is shot, and Mickey is tortured to death with fish hooks, nails, and a knife.

Rachel and Leo regroup, and a hysterical Rachel blames herself for everything that has happened, confessing that she was the one who brought Danny out on the boat the night he drowned. This causes Leo to reveal that he is the killer, and that Danny (who was his biological brother) has been "speaking" to him, ordering him to avenge his death by murdering everyone involved in it. Leo tries to kill Rachel, but she shoots him with his own gun, revealing before she does so that she purposely drowned Danny, who she hated.

In a post-credits scene, Rachel is shown walking away from the camp as Leo gets up, and puts his mask on after it is pushed across the floor by an invisible force. A distorted voice is then heard wailing, "We're coming for you!"

Cast 

 Marcos Gabriel as Leo
 Therese Fretwell as Rachel
 Andrew Williams as Mickey
 Erin Gallagher as Cindy
 Derek Nieves as Seth
 Jasmine Trice as Reagan Childs
 Adam Sterritt as Jeremy
 John Hayden as Trevor Daniels
 Martine Shandles as Tyra Scott
 Randy Weinstein as Man
 Bill Orr as Newscaster
 Dave Smith as Stalker
 Peter Marsha as Stalker Voice

Reception 

Brian Solomon of Bloody Disgusting derided the film, deeming it an "originality-challenged endeavor".

References

External links 

 

1999 films
American ghost films
American slasher films
Camcorder films
Holiday horror films
1990s teen horror films
1999 horror films
American films about revenge
American supernatural horror films
Films about summer camps
Mass murder in fiction
1999 direct-to-video films
American independent films
American teen horror films
Direct-to-video horror films
1999 directorial debut films
1990s English-language films
1990s American films